Minamihata Dam  is a gravity dam located in Fukuoka Prefecture in Japan. The dam is used for flood control, water supply and power production. The catchment area of the dam is 27.5 km2. The dam impounds about 27  ha of land when full and can store 6000 thousand cubic meters of water. The construction of the dam was started on 1979 and completed in 1985.

References

Dams in Fukuoka Prefecture
1985 establishments in Japan